Wágner Luiz Fogolari (born 19 November 1989 in Porto Alegre) or simply Wágner, is a Brazilian footballer who plays for Sampaio Corrêa as a central defender.

Career

Grêmio
In January 2008, as the season starts, he was promoted to the first team after a strong and solid performances in the youth side. His huge physical presence and good aerial game in pre-season impress the managers and earned him a spot in the starting eleven, with only 18 years-old.

But he failed to impress making some weak appearances in the Rio Grande do Sul State Championship, including an own goal in a 2-2 draw against Caxias.

After that, he was relegated to play in the B squad in order to give more experience. In October, he took a squad number in Campeonato Brasileiro roster and back to training with the first team. On November 8, 2008, he was named on the bench for his first Championship game, Gremio's 1-0 away win against Palmeiras, but was an unused substitute.

Footnotes

External links
 Profile 

1989 births
Living people
Brazilian footballers
Brazilian expatriate footballers
Expatriate footballers in Italy
Grêmio Foot-Ball Porto Alegrense players
Esporte Clube São José players
Associação Desportiva São Caetano players
Associação Portuguesa de Desportos players
Cosenza Calcio players
Modena F.C. players
Benevento Calcio players
Serie B players
Campeonato Brasileiro Série B players
Association football defenders
Footballers from Porto Alegre